The Mutiny of the Elisnore is a 1920 American silent action-adventure film directed by Edward Sloman and starring Mitchell Lewis, Helen Ferguson, and Noah Beery Sr. It is an adaptation of the 1914 Jack London novel The Mutiny of the Elsinore. An incomplete copy of the film survives at the UCLA Film and Television Archive.

Plot
As described in a film magazine, during a cruise of the Elsinore, Captain Nathaniel Somers (MacGregor) is assassinated and John Pike (Lewis) takes control of the schooner to provide an income for the skipper's son Dick (Casson Ferguson). The latter dislikes the sea, but Pike insists that he make the voyage to keep his obligations to Margaret West (Helen Ferguson), daughter of a former half-owner of the ship. Members of the crew are cut-throats, and mutiny at the earliest opportunity, giving Pike the fight for his life.

Cast
 Mitchell Lewis as John Pike 
 Helen Ferguson as Margaret West 
 Noah Beery Sr. as Andreas Mellaire 
 Casson Ferguson as Dick Somers 
 William V. Mong as Snoop Jenkins, aka The Rat 
 Norval MacGregor as Captain Nathaniel Somers 
 Sidney D'Albrook as Crimp Sherman 
 J.P. Lockney as Jason West

References

External links

Lantern slide at IMDB.com

1920 films
Films based on works by Jack London
Films directed by Edward Sloman
1920s action adventure films
Films based on American novels
Seafaring films
American black-and-white films
American silent feature films
American action adventure films
Metro Pictures films
1920s English-language films
1920s American films
Silent action adventure films